Marce (born 1974) is a singer/songwriter, born Marcela Pineros in Bogotá, Colombia. Marce is the second of four children born to filmmaker Antonio Jose Pineros and Reiki Master Maria Torres. She wrote her first song at age 9. Raised to be a nomad, Marce developed a diverse world view. Her commitment to social activism led her to pursue a degree in Women's Studies. Marce graduated summa cum laude from Florida International University in 2002. Her debut album, "Marce", was released that same year and received rave reviews. In 2005, she married Allen Guthier at a private ceremony in Gainesville, Florida. In recent years, Marce has performed across the United States and has been featured in publications such as InSite Magazine and FYI Weekly. She was awarded for Best Folk Song in 2006 by Song of the Year, sponsor of VH-1 Save the Music.

Awards
 2007 Independent Music Awards - Finalist - Band Website
 2006 Singer/Songwriter Awards - Honorable Mention
 2006 Song of the Year - Annual Winner - Best Folk Song
 2006 Song of the Year - Monthly Winner - September 2006 - Best Folk Song
 2006 Song of the Year - Monthly Winner - May 2006 - Best Folk Song
 2006 Song of the Year - Monthly Winner - February 2006 - Best Folk Song

Festivals/Showcases
 2007 - International Folk Alliance Conference
 2007 - NYC Chick Singer Night
 2007 - LadyFest South
 2006 - Dewey Beach Music Conference
 2006 - First Coast Pride Festival
 2006 - Miami Chick Singer Night

Discography
"Piece of Mind" (2009)
"Hear My Voice - EP" (2006)
"Sessions at Sonica" (2004)
"Marce" (2002)
"Echo" (2001)

References

External links
Marce Official Website
Review of "Marce" on CD Baby

1974 births
Living people
Colombian women activists
21st-century Colombian women singers
Colombian feminists
Singers from Bogotá
Feminist musicians